Mustapha Adouani (October 2, 1946 – December 14, 2006 in Tunis) was a Tunisian actor.

Filmography 
1984: Par où t'es rentré? On t'a pas vu sortir by Philippe Clair
1986: L'Homme de cendres by Nouri Bouzid : as Ameur
1990: Halfaouine, l'enfant des terrasses by Férid Boughedir : as Si Azzouz
1992: Bezness by Nouri Bouzid : as Kommissar
1993: Le Sultan de la Médina by Moncef Dhouib
1993: Le Nombril du monde by Ariel Zeitoun : as Moktar
1993: Trip nach Tunis by Peter Goedel: as Melik
1996: Un été à La Goulette by Férid Boughedir : as Youssef
1997: Vivre au paradis by Bourlem Guerdjou : as Belkacem
2000: La Faute à Voltaire by Abdellatif Kechiche : as Mostfa
2004: Le prince by Mohamed Zran : as Ali
2004: Noce d'été by Mokhtar Ladjimi

References

External links 

1946 births
2006 deaths
Tunisian male film actors
20th-century Tunisian male actors
21st-century Tunisian male actors